The Ministers of Social Protection of the First Republic of Armenia

Introduction 

The Ministry of Labor and Social Protection was formed in 1918.

Ministers 
'''The Ministers of Social Protection of the First Republic of Armenia:

References

 
First Republic of Armenia
Social Protection